Simone Naval Tata (née Dunoyer)  is a Swiss-born Indian businesswoman belonging to the Tata family.

Simone Tata was born in 1930, and brought up in Geneva, Switzerland and graduated from Geneva University. She visited India as a tourist in 1953, where she met Naval H. Tata. They were married in 1955, and Simone settled permanently in Mumbai. Simone and Naval are the parents of Noel Tata. Simone is the stepmother of the Tata group chairman, Ratan Tata, who is from Naval's previous marriage.

Simone Tata joined the Lakme Board in 1962, when it was a minor subsidiary of Tata Oil Mills, as managing director in 1961, rising to become its chairperson in 1982, and served as Non-Executive Chairman of Trent Ltd. until 30 October 2006.

She was appointed to the board of Tata Industries in 1989.

Seeing growth in the retail sector, in 1996, Tata sold Lakmé to Hindustan Lever Limited (HLL), and created Trent with money from the sale. All shareholders of Lakmé were given equivalent shares in Trent.  The Westside brand and stores belong to Trent.

References

 

Living people
Businesspeople from Mumbai
Swiss emigrants to India
Simone
1930 births
Businesswomen from Maharashtra
20th-century Indian businesswomen
20th-century Indian businesspeople
Businesspeople from Geneva
Trent Limited